Edgeworth is an English toponymic surname. It probably derives from Edgeworth in Gloucestershire, but the name is long established in Ireland, where it is claimed that the family settled in County Longford in 1583.   

Notable people with the surname include:

 Edward Edgeworth (died 1595), Anglican bishop
 Henry Essex Edgeworth (1745–1807), Irish Catholic priest and confessor of Louis XVI
 Kenneth Edgeworth (1880–1972), Irish astronomer, economist and engineer
 Richard Lovell Edgeworth (1744–1817), Anglo-Irish scientist, inventor, writer and educator, father of Maria Edgeworth and Michael Pakenham Edgeworth
 His son Michael Pakenham Edgeworth (1812–1881), botanist
 His daughter Maria Edgeworth (1767–1849), novelist
 His grandson Francis Ysidro Edgeworth (1845–1926), statistician and economist
 Robert Edgeworth-Johnstone (1900–1994), British chemical engineer and inventor

Fictional characters:
 Miles Edgeworth, character from the Ace Attorney video game series

References 

English toponymic surnames